Three polls and one formulaic ranking make up the 2007 NCAA Division I FBS (Football Bowl Subdivision) football rankings, in addition to various publications' preseason polls. Unlike most sports, college football's governing body, the NCAA, does not bestow a national championship title. That title is bestowed by one or more of four different polling agencies. There are two main weekly polls that begin in the preseason: the AP Poll and the Coaches Poll. About halfway through the season, two additional polls are released, the Harris Interactive Poll and the Bowl Championship Series (BCS) standings. The Harris Poll and Coaches Poll are factors in the BCS standings. At the end of the season, the BCS standings determine who plays in the BCS bowl games as well as the BCS National Championship Game.

Legend

AP Poll
As a result of Michigan's loss to Division I FCS Appalachian State, the AP Poll changed its policy on not allowing pollsters to vote for Division I FCS opponents. Now, if the Division I-FCS team has played a Division I FBS team, they are eligible to be voted for in the AP Poll.

Coaches Poll

Harris Interactive Poll

BCS standings
The Bowl Championship Series (BCS) determined the two teams that competed in the 2008 BCS National Championship Game.

References

External links

Rankings
NCAA Division I FBS football rankings
Bowl Championship Series